Dilhan Perera (born 16 September 1969) is a Sri Lankan former cricketer. He played nine first-class matches for Colombo Cricket Club between 1991 and 1993. He was also part of Sri Lanka's squad for the 1988 Youth Cricket World Cup.

References

External links
 

1969 births
Living people
Sri Lankan cricketers
Colombo Cricket Club cricketers
Cricketers from Colombo